This is a list of the legal status of psychoactive cactus by country. This includes but is not limited to the peyote, the San Pedro and the Peruvian torch.

References

Psychoactive cactus
Psychoactive cactus
Psychoactive cactus
Psychoactive cactus
Law by country